The 1962 Segunda División Peruana, the second division of Peruvian football (soccer), was played by 10 teams. The tournament winner, Mariscal Sucre was promoted to the 1963 Peruvian Primera División.

Results

Standings

External links
 La Historia de la Segunda 1962

Peruvian Segunda División seasons
Peru2
2